Statistics of Liberian Premier League in season 1986.

Overview
It was contested by 12 teams, and Mighty Barrolle won the championship.

References
Liberia - List of final tables (RSSSF)

Football competitions in Liberia